Hernán Rivera Letelier (born 11 July 1950 in Talca, Chile) is a Chilean novelist. Until the age of 11 he lived in the Algorta saltpeter mining town, in the north of Chile. When it was closed down, he and his family moved to Antofagasta, where his mother died. His siblings went to live with his aunts. He stayed in Antofagasta, alone, until he was about 11. To survive, he sold newspapers. Later he worked as a messenger for Anglo Lautaro Nirate Company, until his thirst for adventure led him to spend three years traveling in Chile, Bolivia, Perú, Ecuador and Argentina. He returned to Antofagasta in 1973 and began to work at another company, Mantos Blancos. He married a 17-year-old girl when he was 24. Later he left for Pedro de Valdivia, another saltpeter mining town. He completed his seventh and eighth years of study at night school, and at the Inacap educational institute he earned his license as a secondary education instructor. Today he lives in Antofagasta with his wife and four children. He has received the Premio Consejo Nacional de Libro (Chilean National Book Award) twice, in 1994 and 1996. His novel El arte de la resurrección won the Premio Alfaguara de Novela in Spain in 2010.

Although his early works consisted of poetry and stories (Poemas y Pomadas Cuentos breves y Cuescos de brevas), it is as a novelist that he has had the greatest success, both critical and popular. His books are being translated to several languages and it is possible that film versions will be made.

He dreams of having a literary style which blends "the magic of Juan Rulfo, the marvels of Gabriel García Márquez, the playfulness of Cortázar, the refinement of Carlos Fuentes, and the intelligence of Borges." El arte de la resurrección is a comic love story set in the early 1940s during a strike by saltpetre miners in barren northern Chile.  It centres on the obsession of the historical-mythical folk preacher El Cristo de Elqui (the Christ of Elqui) with making a disciple of a devout prostitute called Magalena Mercado.

Published works

 Poemas y pomadas (Poems and Ointments). 1988
 Cuentos breves y cuesco de brevas (Shorts Tales and Tales About Figs). 1990
 La reina Isabel cantaba rancheras (The Queen Isabel Sang Mexican Music). 1994
 Himno del ángel parado en una pata (The Anthem of the Angel Stand in a Feet). 1996
 Fatamorgana de amor con banda de música (Mirage of Love with Music Band). 1998
 Los trenes se van al Purgatorio (Trains Leave to the Purgatory). 2000
 Santa María de las flores negras (Santa María of the Black Flowers). 2002
 Canción para Caminar Sobre las Aguas (Song for Walk Above the Water). 2004
 El Romance del Duende que me Escribe las Novelas (The Romance of the Leprechaun Who Writes My Novels). 2005
 El Fantasista (The Fantasista). 2007
 Mi Nombre es Malarrosa (My Name is Malarrosa). 2008
 La Contadora de Películas (The Movie Speaker). 2009
 El arte de la resurrección  (The Art of the Resurrection). 2010
 El Escritor de Epitafios (The Epitaphs Writer). 2011
 Historia de Amor con Hombre Bailando (Love Story with a Dancing Man). 2013

References

External links 

 Hernan Rivera Letelier by Guillermo Schavelzon & asociados, Agencia litetaria.

1950 births
Living people
20th-century Chilean novelists
20th-century Chilean male writers
Chilean male novelists
Chilean people of French descent
21st-century Chilean novelists
21st-century Chilean male writers